Ngarkat Highway is a road in the southeastern part of South Australia, connecting Pinnaroo and Bordertown. It is designated as part of route B57 which continues north from Pinnaroo along Browns Well Highway to Loxton (concurrent with B12 on Mallee Highway for 7km west of Pinnaroo), and south from Bordertown along Naracoorte Road to Naracoorte (concurrent with A8 on Dukes Highway for 10km east of Cannawigara).

The Ngarkat Highway passes through Ngarkat Conservation Park.

Major intersections

References

Highways in South Australia